The Hindu Kush is an  mountain range in Central and South Asia to the west of the Himalayas. It stretches from central and western Afghanistan into northwestern Pakistan and far southeastern Tajikistan. The range forms the western section of the Hindu Kush Himalayan Region (HKH); to the north, near its northeastern end, the Hindu Kush buttresses the Pamir Mountains near the point where the borders of China, Pakistan and Afghanistan meet, after which it runs southwest through Pakistan and into Afghanistan near their border. The eastern end of the Hindu Kush in the north merges with the Karakoram Range. Towards its southern end, it connects with the White Mountains near the Kabul River. It divides the valley of the Amu Darya (the ancient Oxus) to the north from the Indus River valley to the south.

The Hindu Kush range region was a historically significant center of Buddhism, with sites such as the Bamiyan Buddhas. The range and communities settled in it hosted ancient monasteries, important trade networks and travelers between Central Asia and South Asia. While the vast majority of the region has been majority-Muslim for several centuries now, certain portions of the Hindu Kush only became Islamized relatively recently, such as Kafiristan, which retained ancient polytheistic beliefs until the 19th century when it was converted to Islam by the Durrani Empire and renamed Nuristan ("land of light"). The Hindu Kush range has also been the passageway for invasions of the Indian subcontinent, and continues to be important to contemporary warfare in Afghanistan.

Before Alexander's Arrival Vedic and Avestan name of the Hindu Kush mountains is 'Uparisyena' in Sanskrit and 'Upairisaena' in Avestan (or the mountains crossed by the syena, an eagle), referring to Garuda bringing Soma from across mountain range

Name
The earliest known usage of the Persian name Hindu Kush occurs on a map published about 1000 CE. Some modern scholars remove the space and refer to the mountain range as Hindukush.

Etymology 
The term Hindu Kush means 'Hindu killer', with Kush being a soft variant of the Avestan 'Kaush' meaning kill or killer. Hindu Kush was the frontier boundary to Arab geographers. 

It is also sometimes interpreted as the land of the Hindkowans (Hindki in Pashto) of the region.

According to Hobson-Jobson, a 19th-century British dictionary, Hindukush might be a corruption of the ancient Latin Indicus (Caucasus); the entry mentions the interpretation first given by Ibn Batuta as a popular theory at that time, despite doubts cast upon it.

Other names 
In Vedic Sanskrit, the range was known as upariśyena, and in Avestan, as upāirisaēna (from Proto-Iranian *upārisaina- 'covered with juniper'). It can alternatively be interpreted as "beyond the reach of eagles". In the time of Alexander the Great, the mountain range was referred to as the Caucasus Indicus (as opposed to the Greater Caucasus range between the Caspian and Black Seas), and as Paropamisos (see Paropamisadae) by Hellenic Greeks in the late first millennium BCE.

Some 19th-century encyclopedias and gazetteers state that the term Hindu Kush originally applied only to the peak in the area of the Kushan Pass, which had become a center of the Kushan Empire by the first century.

Geography

The range forms the western section of the Hindu Kush Himalayan Region (HKH) and is the westernmost extension of the Pamir Mountains, the Karakoram and the Himalayas. It divides the valley of the Amu Darya (the ancient Oxus) to the north from the Indus River valley to the south. To the north, near its northeastern end, the Hindu Kush buttresses the Pamir Mountains near the point where the borders of China, Pakistan and Afghanistan meet, after which it runs southwest through Pakistan and into Afghanistan near their border. The eastern end of the Hindu Kush in the north merges with the Karakoram Range. Towards its southern end, it connects with the Spin Ghar Range near the Kabul River.

Peaks 
The mountains of the Hindu Kush range diminish in height as they stretch westward.

Passes 
Numerous high passes ("kotal") transect the mountains, forming a strategically important network for the transit of caravans. The most important mountain pass in Afghanistan is the Salang Pass (Kotal-e Salang) north of Kabul, which links southern Afghanistan to northern Afghanistan. The range has several other passes in Afghanistan, the lowest of which is the southern Shibar pass where the Hindu Kush range terminates.

Before the Salang Tunnel, another feat of engineering was the road constructed through the Tang-e Gharu gorge near Kabul, replacing the ancient Lataband Pass and greatly reducing travel time towards the Pakistani border at the Khyber Pass.

Other high passes in Pakistan include the Lowari Pass at 10,200 feet, the Gomal Pass.

Watershed
The Hindu Kush form the boundary between the Indus watershed in South Asia, and Amu Darya watershed in Central Asia. Melt water from snow and ice feeds major river systems in Central Asia: the Amu Darya, Helmand River (which is a major source of water for the Sistan Basin in southern Afghanistan and Iran), and the Kabul Riverthe last of which is a major tributary of the Indus River. Smaller rivers with headwaters in the range include the Khash, the Farah and the Arashkan (Harut) rivers. The basins of these rivers serve the ecology and economy of the region, but the water flow in these rivers greatly fluctuates, and reliance on these has been a historical problem with extended droughts being commonplace. The eastern end of the range, with the highest peaks, high snow accumulation allows to long-term water storage.

Geology 

Geologically, the range is rooted in the formation of the subcontinent from a region of Gondwana that drifted away from East Africa about 160 million years ago, around the Middle Jurassic period. The Indian subcontinent, Australia and islands of the Indian Ocean rifted further, drifting northeastwards, with the Indian subcontinent colliding with the Eurasian Plate nearly 55 million years ago, towards the end of Palaeocene. This collision created the Himalayas, including the Hindu Kush.

The Hindu Kush are a part of the "young Eurasian mountain range consisting of metamorphic rocks such as schist, gneiss and marble, as well as of intrusives such as granite, diorite of different age and size". The northern regions of the Hindu Kush witness Himalayan winter and have glaciers, while its southeastern end witnesses the fringe of Indian subcontinent summer monsoons.

The Hindu Kush range remains geologically active and is still rising; it is prone to earthquakes. The mountains are orographically described in several parts. In 2005 and 2015 there were some major earthquakes.

This section extends from the Durāh Pass to the Baroghil Pass at the border between northeastern Afghanistan and north Pakistan. The Chitral District of Pakistan is home to Tirich Mir, Noshaq, and Istoro Nalthe highest peaks in the Hindu Kush.

Land cover and land use 

ICIMOD’s first annual regional 30-meter resolution land cover database of HKH generated using public domain Landsat images demonstrated that grassland was the most dominant land cover, followed by barren land, which includes areas with bare areas. In 2000, 2005, 2010, and 2015, grassland covered 37.2%, 37.6%, 38.7%, and 38.23%, respectively, of the total area of the HKH region. During the same years, the second dominant land cover was barren areas, including bare soil and bare rock. In 2000, 2005, 2010, and 2015, bare soil and bare rock covered 32.1, 31.37, 30.35, and 30.69%. The cropland cover in 2000 was about 5.1% and about 5.41% in 2015. Snow and glacier areas covered about 4% of the high-elevation section in 2018, while waterbodies and riverbeds/channels together accounted for 2%. The weather conditions also have an impact on the land cover patterns across the regions. In the HKH, forest cover is mostly distributed in the south and south-eastern areas, where precipitation is more; the grasslands are mostly distributed in the north and north-western parts, while cropland is mostly found in the southern part of the region.

Flora and fauna 
The mountainous areas of Hindu Kush range are mostly barren or at the most sparsely sprinkled with trees and stunted bushes. The inner valleys of the Hindu Kush see little rain and have desert vegetation. On the other hand, Eastern Himalaya is home to multiple biodiversity hotspots, and 353 new species (242 plants, 16 amphibians, 16 reptiles, 14 fish, two birds, two mammals and 61+ invertebrates) have been discovered there in between 1998 and 2008, with an average of 35 new species finds every year. With Eastern Himalaya included, the entire Hindu Kush Himalaya region is home to an estimated 35,000+ species of plants and 200+ species of animals.

History 

The high altitudes of the mountains have historical significance in South and Central Asia. The Hindu Kush range was a major center of Buddhism with sites such as the Bamiyan Buddhas. It has also been the passageway during the invasions of the Indian subcontinent, a region where the Taliban and al-Qaeda grew, and a scene of modern era warfare in Afghanistan. Ancient mines producing lapis lazuli are found in Kowkcheh Valley, while gem-grade emeralds are found north of Kabul in the valley of the Panjsher River and some of its tributaries. According to Walter Schumann, the West Hindu Kush mountains have been the source of the finest Lapis lazuli for thousands of years.

Buddhism was widespread in the ancient Hindu Kush region. The ancient artwork of Buddhism includes the giant rock-carved statues called the Bamiyan Buddhas, in the southern and western end of the Hindu Kush. These statues were destroyed by Taliban Islamists in 2001. The southeastern valleys of Hindu Kush connecting towards the Indus Valley region were a major center that hosted monasteries, religious scholars from distant lands, trade networks and merchants of the ancient Indian subcontinent.

One of the early Buddhist schools, the Mahāsāṃghika-Lokottaravāda, was prominent in the area of Bamiyan. The Chinese Buddhist monk Xuanzang visited a Lokottaravāda monastery in the 7th century CE, at Bamiyan, Afghanistan. Birchbark and palm leaf manuscripts of texts in this monastery's collection, including Mahāyāna sūtras, have been discovered in the caves of Hindu Kush, and these are now a part of the Schøyen Collection. Some manuscripts are in the Gāndhārī language and Kharoṣṭhī script, while others are in Sanskrit and written in forms of the Gupta script.

According to Alfred Foucher, the Hindu Kush and nearby regions gradually converted to Buddhism by the 1st century CE, and this region was the base from where Buddhism crossed the Hindu Kush expanding into the Oxus valley region of Central Asia. Buddhism later disappeared and locals were forced to convert to Islam. Richard Bulliet also proposes that the area north of Hindu Kush was center of a new sect that had spread as far as Kurdistan, remaining in existence until the Abbasid times. The area eventually came under the control of the Hindu Shahi dynasty of Kabul. The Islamic conquest of the area happened under Sabuktigin who conquered Jayapala's dominion west of Peshawar in the 10th century.

Ancient
The significance of the Hindu Kush mountain ranges has been recorded since the time of Darius I of the Achaemenid Empire. Alexander entered the Indian subcontinent through the Hindu Kush as his army moved past the Afghan Valleys in the spring of 329 BCE. He moved towards the Indus Valley river region in the Indian subcontinent in 327 BCE, his armies building several towns in this region over the intervening two years.

After Alexander died in 323 BCE, the region became part of the Seleucid Empire, according to the ancient history of Strabo written in the 1st century BCE, before it became a part of the Indian Maurya Empire around 305 BCE. The region became a part of the Kushan Empire around the start of the common era.

Medieval era
The lands north of the Hindu Kush, in the Hephthalite dominion, Buddhism was the predominant religion by mid 1st millennium CE. These Buddhists were religiously tolerant and they co-existed with followers of Zoroastrianism, Manichaeism, and Nestorian Christianity. This Central Asia region along the Hindu Kush was taken over by Western Turks and Arabs by the eighth century, facing wars with mostly Iranians. One major exception was the period in the mid to late seventh century when the Tang dynasty from China destroyed the Northern Turks and extended its rule all the way to the Oxus River valley and regions of Central Asia bordering all along the Hindu Kush.

The subcontinent and valleys of the Hindu Kush remained unconquered by the Islamic armies until the 9th century, even though they had conquered the southern regions of the Indus River valley such as Sind. Kabul fell to the army of Al-Ma'mun, the seventh Abbasid caliph, in 808 and the local king agreed to accept Islam and pay annual tributes to the caliph. However, states André Wink, inscriptional evidence suggests that the Kabul area near Hindu Kush had an early presence of Islam. When the extraction of silver from the mines in the Hindu Kush was at its greatest (c.850), the value of silver in relation to gold dropped, and the content of silver in the Carolingian denarius was increased so that it should maintain its intrinsic value.

The range came under the control of the Hindu Shahi dynasty of Kabul but was conquered by Sabuktigin who took all of Jayapala's dominion west of Peshawar.

Mahmud of Ghazni came to power in 998 CE, in Ghazna, Afghanistan, south of Kabul and the Hindu Kush range. He began a military campaign that rapidly brought both sides of the Hindu Kush range under his rule. From his mountainous Afghani base, he systematically raided and plundered kingdoms in north India from east of the Indus river to west of Yamuna river seventeen times between 997 and 1030. Mahmud of Ghazni raided the treasuries of kingdoms, sacked cities, and destroyed Hindu temples, with each campaign starting every spring, but he and his army returned to Ghazni and the Hindu Kush base before monsoons arrived in the northwestern part of the subcontinent. He retracted each time, only extending Islamic rule into western Punjab.

In 1017, the Iranian Islamic historian Al-Biruni was deported after a war that Mahmud of Ghazni won, to the northwest Indian subcontinent under Mahmud's rule. Al Biruni stayed in the region for about fifteen years, learnt Sanskrit, and translated many Indian texts, and wrote about Indian society, culture, sciences, and religion in Persian and Arabic. He stayed for some time in the Hindu Kush region, particularly near Kabul. In 1019, he recorded and described a solar eclipse in what is the modern era Laghman Province of Afghanistan through which Hindu Kush pass. Al Biruni also wrote about early history of the Hindu Kush region and Kabul kings, who ruled the region long before he arrived, but this history is inconsistent with other records available from that era. Al Biruni was supported by Sultan Mahmud. Al Biruni found it difficult to get access to Indian literature locally in the Hindu Kush area, and to explain this he wrote, "Mahmud utterly ruined the prosperity of the country, and performed wonderful exploits by which the Hindus became the atoms scattered in all directions, and like a tale of old in the mouth of the people. (...) This is the reason, too, why Hindu sciences have retired far from those parts of the country conquered by us, and have fled to places which our hand cannot yet reach, to Kashmir, Benares and other places".

In the late 12th century, the historically influential Ghurid empire led by Mu'izz al-Din ruled the Hindu Kush region. He was influential in seeding the Delhi Sultanate, shifting the base of his Sultanate from south of the Hindu Kush range and Ghazni towards the Yamuna River and Delhi. He thus helped bring Islamic rule to the northern plains of the Indian subcontinent.

The Moroccan traveler Ibn Battuta arrived in the Delhi Sultanate by passing through the Hindu Kush. The mountain passes of the Hindu Kush range were used by Timur and his army and they crossed to launch the 1398 invasion of the northern Indian subcontinent. Timur, also known as Temur or Tamerlane in Western scholarly literature, marched with his army to Delhi, plundering and killing all the way. He arrived in the capital Delhi where his army looted and killed its residents. Then he carried the wealth and the captured slaves, returning to his capital through the Hindu Kush.

Babur, the founder of the Mughal Empire, was a patrilineal descendant of Timur with roots in Central Asia. He first established himself and his army in Kabul and the Hindu Kush region. In 1526, he made his move into north India, and won the Battle of Panipat, ending the last Delhi Sultanate dynasty, and starting the era of the Mughals.

Slavery

Slavery, as with all major ancient and medieval societies, has been a part of Central Asia and South Asia history. The Hindu Kush mountain passes connected the slave markets of Central Asia with slaves seized in South Asia. The seizure and transportation of slaves from the Indian subcontinent became intense in and after the 8th century CE, with evidence suggesting that the slave transport involved "hundreds of thousands" of slaves from India in different periods of Islamic rule era. According to John Coatsworth and others, the slave trading operations during the pre-Akbar Mughal and Delhi Sultanate era "sent thousands of Hindus every year north to Central Asia to pay for horses and other goods". However, the interaction between Central Asia and South Asia through the Hindu Kush was not limited to slavery, it included trading in food, goods, horses and weapons.

The practice of raiding tribes, hunting, and kidnapping people for slave trading continued through the 19th century, at an extensive scale, around the Hindu Kush. According to a British Anti-Slavery Society report of 1874, the governor of Faizabad, Mir Ghulam Bey, kept 8,000 horses and cavalrymen who routinely captured non-Muslims as well as Shia Muslims as slaves. Others alleged to be involved in the slave trade were feudal lords such as Ameer Sheer Ali. The isolated communities in the Hindu Kush were one of the targets of these slave-hunting expeditions.

Modern era
In the early 19th century, the Sikh Empire expanded under Ranjit Singh in the northwest as far as the Hindu Kush range. However, the people of so-called Kafiristan practiced had ancient polytheistic traditions until the 1896 invasion and conversion to Islam at the hands of Afghans under Amir Abdur Rahman Khan.

The Hindu Kush served as a geographical barrier to the British Empire, leading to a paucity of information and scarce direct interaction between the British colonial officials and Central Asian peoples. The British had to rely on tribal chiefs, Sadozai and Barakzai noblemen for information, and they generally downplayed the reports of slavery and other violence for geo-political strategic considerations.

In the colonial era, the Hindu Kush was considered, informally, the dividing line between Russian and British areas of influence in Afghanistan. During the Cold War the Hindu Kush range became a strategic theatre, especially during the 1980s when Soviet forces and their Afghan allies fought the Afghan mujahideen channelled through Pakistan. After the Soviet withdrawal and the end of the Cold War, many mujahideen morphed into Taliban and al-Qaeda forces imposing a strict interpretation of Islamic law (Sharia), with Kabul, these mountains, and other parts of Afghanistan as their base. Other Mujahideen joined the Northern Alliance to oppose the Taliban rule.

After the 11 September 2001 terror attacks in New York City and Washington D.C., the American and ISAF campaign against Al Qaeda and their Taliban allies made the Hindu Kush once again a militarised conflict zone.

Climate change 

The 2019 Hindu Kush Himalaya Assessment concluded that between 1901 to 2014, the Hindu Kush Himalaya (or HKH) region had already experienced warming of 0.1 °C per decade, with the warming rate accelerating to 0.2 °C per decade over the past 50 years.Over the past 50 years, the frequency of warm days and nights had also increased by 1.2 days and 1.7 nights per decade, while the frequency of extreme warm days and nights had increased by 1.26 days and 2.54 nights per decade. There was also a corresponding decline of 0.5 cold days, 0.85 extreme cold days, 1 cold night, and 2.4 extreme cold nights per decade. The length of the growing season has increased by 4.25 days per decade. There is less conclusive evidence of light precipitation becoming less frequent while heavy precipitation became both more frequent and more intense. Finally, since 1970s glaciers have retreated everywhere in the region beside Karakoram, eastern Pamir, and western Kunlun, where there has been an unexpected increase in snowfall. Glacier retreat had been followed by an increase in the number of glacial lakes, some of which may be prone to dangerous floods.

In the future, if the Paris Agreement goal of 1.5 °C of global warming is not exceeded, warming in the HKH will be at least 0.3 °C higher, and at least 0.7 °C higher in the hotspots of northwest Himalaya and Karakoram. If the Paris Agreement goals are broken, then the region is expected to warm by 1.7–2.4 °C in the near future (2036–2065) and by 2.2–3.3 °C (2066–2095) near the end of the century under the "intermediate" Representative Concentration Pathway 4.5 (RCP4.5). Under the high-warming RCP8.5 scenario where the annual emissions continue to increase for the rest of the century, the expected regional warming is 2.3–3.2 °C and 4.2–6.5 °C, respectively. Under all scenarios, winters will warm more than the summers, and the Tibetan Plateau, the central Himalayan Range, and the Karakoram will continue to warm more than the rest of the region. Climate change will also lead to the degradation of up to 81% of the region's permafrost by the end of the century.

Future precipitation is projected to increase as well, but CMIP5 models struggle to make specific projections due to the region's topography: the most certain finding is that the monsoon precipitation in the region will increase by 4–12% in the near future and by 4–25% in the long term. There has also been modelling of the changes in snow cover, but it is limited to the end of century under the RCP 8.5 scenario: it projects declines of 30–50% in the Indus Basin, 50–60% in the Ganges basin, and 50–70% in the Brahmaputra Basin, as the snowline elevation in these regions will rise by between 4.4 and 10.0 m/yr. There has been more extensive modelling of glacier trends: it is projected that one third of all glaciers in the extended HKH region will be lost by 2100 even if the warming is limited to 1.5 °C (with over half of that loss in the Eastern Himalaya region), while RCP 4.5 and RCP 8.5 are likely to lead to the losses of 50% and >67% of the region's glaciers over the same timeframe. Glacier melt is projected to accelerate regional river flows until the amount of meltwater peaks around 2060, going into an irreversible decline afterwards. Since precipitation will continue to increase even as the glacier meltwater contribution declines, annual river flows are only expected to diminish in the western basins where contribution from the monsoon is low: however, irrigation and hydropower generation would still have to adjust to greater interannual variability and lower pre-monsoon flows in all of the region's rivers.

Future development and adaptation 
A range of adaptation efforts are already undertaken across the HKH region: however, they suffer from underinvestment and insufficient coordination between the various state, institutional and other non-state efforts, and need to be "urgently" strengthened in order to be commensurate with the challenges ahead. 

The 2019 Hindu Kush Himalaya Assessment outlined three main "storylines" for the region between now and 2080: "business-as-usual" (or "muddling through"), with no significant change from the current trends and development/adaptation initiatives proceeding as they do now; "downhill", where the intensity of global climate change is high, local initiatives fail and regional cooperation breaks down; and "prosperous", where extensive cooperation allows region's communities to weather "moderate" climate change and increase their living standards while also preserving the region's biodiversity. In addition, it described two alternate pathways through which the "prosperous" future can be achieved: the first focuses on top-down, large-scale development and the latter describes a bottom-up, decentralized alternative.

Ethnography
Pre-Islamic populations of the Hindu Kush included Shins, Yeshkuns, Chiliss, Neemchas Koli, Palus, Gaware, and Krammins.

See also
Mount Imeon
Paropamisus Mountains
 A Short Walk in the Hindu Kush
Geography of Afghanistan
Geography of Pakistan
Karakoram
Hindustan
List of highest mountains (a list of mountains above 7,200m)
List of mountain ranges
2002 Hindu Kush earthquakes
2005 Hindu Kush earthquake

Notes

References

Citations

Sources 
 Works cited

   (facsimile of the original edition).

Further reading
 Drew, Frederic (1877). The Northern Barrier of India: A Popular Account of the Jammoo and Kashmir Territories with Illustrations. Frederic Drew. 1st edition: Edward Stanford, London. Reprint: Light & Life Publishers, Jammu, 1971
 Gibb, H. A. R. (1929). Ibn Battūta: Travels in Asia and Africa, 1325–1354. Translated and selected by H. A. R. Gibb. Reprint: Asian Educational Services, New Delhi and Madras, 1992
 Gordon, T. E. (1876). The Roof of the World: Being the Narrative of a Journey over the High Plateau of Tibet to the Russian Frontier and the Oxus Sources on Pamir. Edinburgh. Edmonston and Douglas. Reprint: Ch’eng Wen Publishing Company. Tapei, 1971
 Leitner, Gottlieb Wilhelm (1890). Dardistan in 1866, 1886 and 1893: Being An Account of the History, Religions, Customs, Legends, Fables and Songs of Gilgit, Chilas, Kandia (Gabrial) Yasin, Chitral, Hunza, Nagyr and other parts of the Hindukush, as also a supplement to the second edition of The Hunza and Nagyr Handbook. And An Epitome of Part III of the author's 'The Languages and Races of Dardistan'''. Reprint, 1978. Manjusri Publishing House, New Delhi. 
 Newby, Eric. (1958). A Short Walk in the Hindu Kush. Secker, London. Reprint: Lonely Planet. 
 Yule, Henry and Burnell, A. C. (1886). Hobson-Jobson: The Anglo-Indian Dictionary. 1996 reprint by Wordsworth Editions Ltd. 
 A Country Study: Afghanistan, Library of Congress
 Ervin Grötzbach, 
 Encyclopædia Britannica, 15th Ed., Vol. 21, pp. 54–55, 65, 1987
 An Advanced History of India, by R. C. Majumdar, H. C. Raychaudhuri, K.Datta, 2nd Ed., MacMillan and Co., London, pp. 336–37, 1965
 The Cambridge History of India, Vol. IV: The Mughul Period'', by W. Haig & R. Burn, S. Chand & Co., New Delhi, pp. 98–99, 1963

External links

Khyber Pass
Early Explorers of the Hindu Kush 
Geology
More geology
And more geology

 
Geography of Afghanistan
History of Pakistan
Iranian Plateau
Landforms of Badakhshan Province
Landforms of Baghlan Province
Landforms of Bamyan Province
Landforms of Kabul Province
Landforms of Kapisa Province
Landforms of Nuristan Province
Landforms of Panjshir Province
Landforms of Parwan Province
Landforms of South Asia
Mountain ranges of Afghanistan
Mountain ranges of Asia
Mountain ranges of Khyber Pakhtunkhwa
Mountain ranges of Pakistan
Mountain ranges of the Himalayas
Physiographic provinces
Sites along the Silk Road